Albert Clark may refer to:

Albert P. Clark (1913–2010), American superintendent of the US Air Force Academy
Albert Clarke (1916–1944), English footballer
Albert Curtis Clark (1859–1937), English classical scholar 
Albert O. Clark (1858–1935), American architect
Albert Clark (artist) (1843–1928), English painter
Albert Clark (baseball) (1910–1988), American baseball player

See also
Bert Clark (disambiguation)
Al Clark (disambiguation)
Bertie Clarke (1918–1993), West Indian cricketer